ERC2 may refer to:

 ERC2 (gene), a human protein-coding gene
 European Referendum Campaign